Přestavlky u Čerčan is a municipality and village in Benešov District in the Central Bohemian Region of the Czech Republic. It has about 400 inhabitants.

Administrative parts
Villages and hamlets of Borka, Chlum, Čistec, Doubravice 1.díl and Dubsko are administrative parts of Přestavlky u Čerčan.

References

Villages in Benešov District